Leroy Chiao (born August 28, 1960) is an American chemical engineer, retired NASA astronaut, entrepreneur, motivational speaker, and engineering consultant. Chiao flew on three Space Shuttle flights, and was the commander of Expedition 10, where he lived on board the International Space Station from October 13, 2004 to April 24, 2005. He is also a co-author and researcher for the Advanced Diagnostic Ultrasound in Microgravity project.

Early life 
Chiao was born in Milwaukee, Wisconsin and raised in Danville, California. His parents were originally from mainland China and met while studying at a university in Taiwan before immigrating to the U.S.  Chiao graduated from Monte Vista High School in Danville in 1978. In 1983, he earned a B.S. in chemical engineering from the University of California, Berkeley. He later earned an M.S. and a Ph.D. in chemical engineering from the University of California, Santa Barbara in 1985 and 1987, respectively.

Chiao's parents were both chemical engineers who immigrated to Milwaukee from the Republic of China in the late 1950s for graduate school. Stressing a high doctorate level science education, his parents encouraged him to follow their lead and become an engineer. Chiao's Aviator call sign is "Shandong," the name of the Chinese province where his parents grew up.

Pre-NASA career 

Upon graduation, Chiao joined the Hexcel Corporation in Dublin, California from 1987 to 1989. He was involved in process, manufacturing, and engineering research on advanced aerospace materials, and worked on a joint NASA-JPL/Hexcel project to develop a practical, optically correct, precision segment reflector made entirely of advanced polymer composite materials for future space telescopes, as well as working on cure modeling and finite element analysis. In January 1989, Chiao joined the Lawrence Livermore National Laboratory in Livermore, California, where he was involved in processing research for fabrication of filament-wound and thick-section aerospace composites. Chiao also developed and demonstrated a mechanistic cure model for graphite fiber and epoxy composite material (see Graphite-reinforced plastic). An instrument-rated pilot, Chiao has logged over 2500 flight hours in a variety of aircraft.

NASA career 
At age 29, Chiao was selected by NASA in January 1990 (the youngest in Group 13) and became an astronaut in July 1991. He qualified for flight assignment as a mission specialist. His technical assignments included: Space Shuttle flight software verification in the Shuttle Avionics Integration Laboratory (SAIL); crew equipment, Spacelab, Spacehab, and payload issues for the Astronaut Office Mission Development Branch; training and flight data file issues; and extravehicular activity (EVA) issues for the EVA Branch. Chiao also served as Chief of the Astronaut Office EVA Branch.

A veteran of four space flights, Chiao flew as a mission specialist on STS-65 in 1994, STS-72 in 1996 and STS-92 in 2000. Chiao had logged over 36 days and 12.5 hours in space, including over 26 EVA hours in four space walks, prior to his mission aboard the International Space Station.

Chiao is fluent in Mandarin Chinese. Additionally, Chiao also learned Russian to communicate with Russian cosmonauts as part of the International Space Station program. On November 2, 2004, Chiao voted in the 2004 United States presidential election from aboard the International Space Station, making him the first American to vote in a presidential election while in space. McDonald's presented Chiao with a Big Mac and French Fries at their branch in Star City as one of his first meals since returning to Earth after his ISS assignment. Among the souvenirs he brought into space in his previous space flights were a Chinese flag and a quartz-carved rose from Hong Kong.

Chiao was the inadvertent developer of the procedure to use the IRED (Interim Resistive Exercise Device) to excite the solar arrays of the ISS. During an exercise session of squats on the ISS, Chiao sent a vibration through the space station that caused the solar arrays to ripple – a low amplitude frequency response. When Chiao did this, the response from Mission Control was "knock it off." However, several years later during an ISS assembly flight in December 2006 (STS-116), German astronaut Thomas Reiter of the European Space Agency was told to do 30 seconds of robust exercise on the bungee-bar IRED machine to help retract ISS solar arrays, specifically to relieve tension in a wire system that was preventing the array from folding up like an accordion. An eventual unplanned spacewalk during the same shuttle mission managed to finally retract the array.

Chiao left NASA in December 2005 to pursue employment in the private sector.

Spaceflight experience 

STS-65 Columbia (July 8–23, 1994) launched from and returned to land at the Kennedy Space Center, Florida, setting a new flight duration record for the Space Shuttle program at that time. The STS-65 mission flew the second International Microgravity Laboratory (IML-2). During the 15-day flight the seven-member crew conducted more than 80 experiments focusing on materials and life sciences research in microgravity. The STS-65 mission was accomplished in 236 orbits of the Earth, traveling 6.1 million miles in 353 hours and 55 minutes.

STS-72 Endeavour (January 11–20, 1996) was a nine-day mission during which the crew retrieved the Space Flyer Unit (launched from Japan ten months earlier), and deployed and retrieved the OAST-Flyer. Chiao performed two spacewalks designed to demonstrate tools and hardware, and evaluate techniques to be used in the assembly of the International Space Station. In completing this mission, Chiao logged a total of 214 hours and 41 seconds in space, including just over thirteen EVA hours, and traveled 3.7 million miles in 142 orbits of the Earth.

STS-92 Discovery (October 11–24, 2000) was launched from the Kennedy Space Center, Florida and returned to land at Edwards Air Force Base, California. During the 13-day flight, the seven member crew attached the Z1 Truss and Pressurized Mating Adapter 3 to the International Space Station using Discovery's robotic arm and performed four spacewalks to configure these elements. This expansion of the ISS opened the door for future assembly missions and prepared the station for its first resident crew. Chiao totaled 13 hours and 16 minutes of EVA time in two spacewalks. The STS-92 mission was accomplished in 202 orbits, traveling 5.3 million miles in 12 days, 21 hours, 40 minutes and 25 seconds.

ISS Expedition 10 (October 9, 2004 – April 24, 2005), Chiao was the commander of Expedition 10 on the International Space Station.

Post-NASA career 
After leaving NASA, Chiao has become involved in entrepreneurial business ventures in both the U.S. and China.

In early 2006, he joined the Atlanta firm of SpaceWorks Enterprises, Inc. (SEI) as an affiliate and technical advisor (on a non-exclusive basis). Dr. Chiao assists the firm on space technologies and operating processes for future space exploration concepts and research on the commercialization of space. In July 2006, Chiao accepted a position as the Executive Vice President for Space Operations and a Director of Excalibur Almaz Limited. He was responsible for operational aspects of spaceflight, including training for both the capsule and space station. The company assembled a team from the Isle of Man, the United States, Russia, the Ukraine, and Continental Europe to begin work towards refurbishing and flying a capsule in space based upon the design of the Almaz capsules.

In March 2006, Chiao began an appointment in the Mechanical Engineering Department at the Louisiana State University as the first Raborn Distinguished Chair Max Faget Professor.

Chiao is also currently serving as the Chairman of the National Space Biomedical Research Institute (NSBRI) User Panel, which is attached to the Baylor College of Medicine. The NSBRI, funded by NASA, is a consortium of institutions studying the health risks related to long-duration space flight. The Institute's User Panel is an advisory board composed of former and current astronauts and flight surgeons that ensures NSBRI's research program is focused on astronaut health and safety. In preparation for lunar and Mars exploration, Chiao and the User Panel will help align NSBRI's science and technology projects with the needs of astronauts on long missions.

In July 2007, Chiao joined an expedition to visit Devon Island and conduct 5 days of webcasts and other instructional activities spanning the period of 16–20 July 2007. This activity was in collaboration with the Mars Institute, the Challenger Center for Space Science Education, The Explorers Club and SpaceRef Interactive, Inc. He conducted these webcasts from the Haughton-Mars Project Research Station and nearby locations to illustrate how NASA and other space agencies are learning to live on the Moon and Mars here on Earth.

Chiao appeared in an episode of MANswers in 2008 explaining how to neutralize an astronaut in space who has gone berserk. 

In May 2009 Chiao wrote a few blog articles on Gizmodo.com detailing some of his space experiences.

In May 2009 Chiao was named as a member of the Review of United States Human Space Flight Plans Committee an independent review requested by the Office of Science and Technology Policy (OSTP) on May 7, 2009.

In a special to CNN written by Chiao on 1 September 2011, he suggested that China be permitted to join the International Space Station program to remedy the issue relating to the limited options available for space travel, following the conclusion of the United States space shuttle program, and a failure of a Russian Soyuz spacecraft on 24 August 2011.

From 2011–2016, Chiao served Epiphan Video as VP Aerospace. He currently serves as an advisor to the company. Based on NASA's space technologies, Epiphan Video produces high-resolution video capture, streaming, and recording products for the medical, educational, IT and industrial markets. Chiao's role at Epiphan Video is to work with the aerospace industry to define the company's vision and achieve strategic goals in areas such as air traffic control.

From 2012–2016, Chiao was served as the special advisor – human spaceflight for the Space Foundation. He has been an advisor to the Houston Association of Space and Science Education since 2014. He is currently a co-founder and CEO of OneOrbit, a corporate keynote and training company, which also offers educational programs for schools and educators.

Personal life 
Chiao married his wife, Karen, in 2003. She is a photographer, and her father is Dutch. The couple has two children: twins Henry and Caroline. Chiao enjoys flying his Grumman Tiger aircraft, as well as downhill skiing. He speaks English, Mandarin Chinese, and Russian.

Awards and honors 
 NASA Distinguished Service Medal (2005)
 NASA Exceptional Service Medals (1996, 2000)
 NASA Individual Achievement Awards (2001, 2002, 2003, 2004)
 NASA Group Achievement Awards (1995, 1997)
 NASA Space Flight Medals (1994, 1996, 2000, 2005)
 De la Vaulx Medal (1994)
 Induction into the Space Technology Hall of Fame for Mediphan - DistanceDoc and MedRecorder

See also 
 List of Asian American astronauts
 Ed Lu
 Taylor Wang

References

External links 

 Chiao's Website
 Chiao's Blog
 Expedition 10 Earth Observation Photos from Dr. Leroy Chiao
 Spacefacts biography of Leroy Chiao
 Review of U.S. Human Space Flight Plans Committee website

1960 births
American motivational speakers
Crew members of the International Space Station
Engineers from Wisconsin
Commanders of the International Space Station
Lawrence Livermore National Laboratory staff
Living people
Louisiana State University faculty
Members of Committee of 100
Businesspeople from Milwaukee
UC Berkeley College of Chemistry alumni
University of California, Santa Barbara alumni
People from Danville, California
Engineers from California
NASA civilian astronauts
American aviators of Chinese descent
Space Shuttle program astronauts
Spacewalkers
Chinese astronauts